Blind Spot is a 1947 American mystery thriller film noir directed by Robert Gordon and starring Chester Morris, Constance Dowling, and Steven Geray.

Premise
A mystery writer gets blind drunk on the same night on which the publisher he hates is murdered. The writer becomes the key suspect.

Cast
 Chester Morris as Jeffrey Andrews
 Constance Dowling as Evelyn Green
 Steven Geray as Lloyd Harrison
 James Bell as Det. Lt. Fred Applegate
 William Forrest as Henry Small

References

External links
 
 
 
 

1947 films
1940s mystery thriller films
American mystery thriller films
American black-and-white films
Columbia Pictures films
Film noir
Films directed by Robert Gordon
Films scored by Paul Sawtell
1940s English-language films
1940s American films